H McCallum was a professional rugby league footballer in the Australian competition, the New South Wales Rugby League.

McCallum's only matches were for the Eastern Suburbs club in the 1936 season.

References
 The Encyclopedia Of Rugby League; Alan Whiticker & Glen Hudson

Australian rugby league players
Sydney Roosters players
Possibly living people
Year of birth missing
Place of birth missing (living people)